Ngala is a Zande language spoken in the northeast of the Democratic Republic of the Congo that was first described by Stefano Santandrea.  It has been influenced by one or more of the Banda languages.

References

Zande languages
Languages of the Democratic Republic of the Congo